The Sony α7 III (model ILCE-7M3) is a full-frame mirrorless interchangeable-lens camera manufactured by Sony. It was announced on 26 February 2018 as the successor to the Sony α7 II and available April 10, 2018. Described by Sony as "the basic model," the camera shares many features with the high-end Sony α7R III and α9 models. It was succeeded by the Sony α7 IV, announced on October 21, 2021.

Features
The camera features several advancements over the previous model, the α7 II, incorporating some features from the higher-end α7R III and α9.
 24 MP full-frame BSI CMOS sensor
 693 Phase Detection AF Points with 93% coverage, inherited from α9 and 425 contrast AF points
 Continuous eye autofocus mode called Eye AF with High Tracking ability
 5-axis optical in-body image stabilization with a 5.0 step shutter speed advantage
 10 fps continuous shooting (mechanical or silent)
 Multiple 4K (3840x2160) video modes: 4K/24p oversampled from 6K sensor output, or 4K/30p oversampled from 5K cropped portion of sensor
15 stops of dynamic range
 Full HD (1920x1080) video at 120 fps
 Larger 'Z'-series (NP-FZ100) battery from α9 and α7R III that is rated at 710 shots (CIPA measurement) - offering the world's longest battery life of any mirrorless camera
Upgraded operability and functionality including addition of joystick for adjusting focus points, Dual SD Card Slots, SuperSpeed USB (USB 3.1 Gen 1) USB Type-C Terminal
ISO range from 100 to 51,200 (expandable to 204,800)
Weather sealed, magnesium alloy body
No built-in flash.
2.36 million dot OLED viewfinder with 0.78x magnification
Supports 4 different video file formats (XAVC S 4K, XAVC S HD, or AVCHD)

Improvements over the Sony α7 II 
The Sony α7 III improved in a number of aspects compared to its predecessor, the α7 II, which was released four years earlier in November, 2014. 

 4K video modes and 120fps full HD video instead of the A7 II's limited full HD (1920x1080) movie modes. 
 Continuous burst increased to 10fps instead of 5fps. 
 Maximum ISO sensitivity of 51,200 instead of 25,600. 
 Upgraded sensor with 693 Phase Detection auto-focus points vs. 117 contrast AF points. 
 Newer Z battery system (NP-FZ100) rated to 710 shots instead of 340.
 Battery capacity 7.2V / 16.4Wh (2280mAh).
 Dual SD card slots instead of a single card slot. 
 Bluetooth for increased phone communication options. 
 Introduction of a touch screen but lower resolution 922,000 dot display instead of 1.23 million. 
 Newer ergonomic layout similar to the earlier A9 and A7R III including the addition of a joystick. 

The camera's rounded feature set and launch price were highly praised. Reviewers noted it as a flexible and competitive tool for all types of photography.

Issues 
Sony A7 III does not include vertical AA filter, only horizontal. Which is improve sharpness, but also creates visible amount of moire on clothes and hair.

See also
Comparison of Sony α7 cameras
List of Sony E-mount lenses
Exmor R

References

External links

 AlphaUniverse

α7 III
Cameras introduced in 2018
Full-frame mirrorless interchangeable lens cameras